John Wiltshire may refer to:

 John Wiltshire (actor), Australian actor and producer
 John Wiltshire (cricketer) (born 1952), New Zealand cricketer
John Wiltshire (MP) for Arundel (UK Parliament constituency)